Nigerose phosphorylase (cphy1874 (gene)) is an enzyme with systematic name 3-O-alpha-D-glucopyranosyl-D-glucopyranose:phosphate beta-D-glucosyltransferase. This enzyme catalyses the following chemical reaction

 3-O-alpha-D-glucopyranosyl-D-glucopyranose + phosphate  D-glucose + beta-D-glucose 1-phosphate

The enzymes from Clostridium phytofermentans is specific for nigerose.

References

External links 

EC 2.4.1